Stebler is a Swiss surname. It may refer to:

Stebler, notable family in Busswil bei Büren, Switzerland
Annie Stebler-Hopf (1861-1918), Swiss painter
Christian Stebler, Swiss cross-country skier
Fred Stebler House, officially designated landmark in Riverside, California
Friedrich Gottlieb Stebler (1852–1935), Swiss agriculturalist and ethnographer
Peter Stebler (1927–2010), Swiss Olympic rower
Pius Stebler, Swiss politician
Serge Stebler, mayor of French commune Roppeviller 2020
Urs Stebler, member of Handball Grauholz, 2008-2009

See also 
 Stabler (surname)
 Stäbler